High Spirits is an album by Jamaican saxophonist Joe Harriott featuring selections from the musical High Spirits written by Hugh Martin and Timothy Gray which was recorded in England in 1964 and released on the Columbia (UK) label.

Reception
All About Jazz writer, Duncan Heining, stated: "Were it not for [his] earlier achievements, High Spirits might come more highly recommended. It is of a much lighter weight but it does have its share of pleasures. It is doubtful that Harriott could ever have made a bad record and, by most other people's standards, this would be top flight. The shortcoming of High Spirits lies in the sense that these show tunes, from the musical based on Noël Coward's play Blithe Spirit, are really fairly average West End/Broadway fare".

Track listing
All compositions by Hugh Martin and Timothy Gray arranged by Pat Smythe
 "Home Sweet Heaven" - 3:37
 "If I Have You" - 5:56
 "Go Into Your Trance' - 4:18
 "You'd Better Love Me" - 4:20
 "I Know Your Heart" - 3:40
 "Was She Prettier Than I" - 5:30
 "Forever and a Day" - 5:28
 "Something Tells Me" - 5:12

Personnel 

Joe Harriott - alto saxophone
Shake Keane - trumpet, flugelhorn 
Pat Smythe - piano
Coleridge Goode - bass
Bobby Orr - drums

References 

Columbia Records albums
Joe Harriott albums
1964 albums